Martinscroft is a part of the civil parish of Woolston in Warrington, Cheshire, England.

It is rumoured that Battery Lane in the village got its name from where Oliver Cromwell stored his weapons during his visit in the civil war.

Martinscroft Green is the village green and is also a popular place for recreational activities.

It recently has been enlarged by new housing estates and the building of a hotel, although it has a few old cottages still along the village green.

References

External links

Villages in Cheshire
Warrington